Alden Township is a township in Hardin County, Iowa, USA.

History 
Alden Township was organized in 1856. It was named for Henry Alden, a pioneer settler.

References 

Townships in Hardin County, Iowa
Townships in Iowa
1856 establishments in Iowa